Chapelhouse Reservoir is a water reservoir near Uldale in Cumbria, England.

History
It involved damming the River Ellen above Uldale to provide water for Aspatria and Silloth. It is named after Chapelhouse Farm which is close by and it is owned by United Utilities. As part of the United Utilities project to supply West Cumbria from Thirlmere, the extraction of water from Chapelhouse Reservoir ceased in October 2022. Decommissioning of Chapelhouse Reservoir, along with Overwater and Crummock Water, is expected to begin in 2025.

References

Drinking water reservoirs in England
Reservoirs in Cumbria
Lakes of the Lake District
Allerdale